Maťo Homola (born 19 July 1994, in Bratislava) is a Slovak racing driver. He is currently driving in TCR Europe in Target Competition with Hyundai i30 N TCR. Maťo became also a brand new Hyundai N ambassador for Slovakia in 2019. 

After having successfully finished on 5th position in 2016  in TCR International Series with B3 Racing Team Hungary, Mato Homola has switched to DG Sport Competition and Opel Astra OPC TCR. Before TCR, Mato Homola had raced successive seasons in the European Touring Car Cup for Homola Motorsport. He was the runner-up in the championship in both 2013 and 2014 in the S2000 class. In 2015 he made the switch to the Single-makes Trophy where every driver competes with a SEAT León Cup Racer. In 2015 he also made a one-off appearance at the Slovakian round in the WTCC with Campos Racing.

FIA WTCR 2018 
Before the end of 2017 season, TCR International Series and FIA WTCC agreed on a mutual collaboration that led to a brand new world championship - FIA WTCR.

Homola, as the only Slovak driver, got into the FIA WTCR starting grid, mainly thanks to the positive relationship with DG Sport Competition. Homola competed in FIA WTCR with brand new Peugeot 308 TCR in Belgian team DG Sport Competition.

Homola placed first on the Vila Real race track in Portugal. During the whole race, he was fighting with 3-time BTCC Champion, Gordon Shedden, and 4-time World Champion, Yvan Muller on Hyundai i30 N TCR. Both of them couldn't pass Homola and he finished in 1st place.

Homola finished the FIA WTCR season in 18th place.

Racing record

Career summary

* Season still in progress.

Complete World Touring Car Championship results
(key) (Races in bold indicate pole position) (Races in italics indicate fastest lap)

Complete TCR International Series results
(key) (Races in bold indicate pole position) (Races in italics indicate fastest lap)

† Driver did not finish the race, but was classified as he completed over 75% of the race distance.

Complete World Touring Car Cup results
(key) (Races in bold indicate pole position) (Races in italics indicate fastest lap)

Complete TCR Europe Touring Car Series results
(key) (Races in bold indicate pole position) (Races in italics indicate fastest lap)

† Driver did not finish the race, but was classified as he completed over 75% of the race distance.

References

External links
 
 

1994 births
Living people
European Touring Car Cup drivers
Sportspeople from Bratislava
Slovak racing drivers
World Touring Car Championship drivers
World Touring Car Cup drivers
24H Series drivers
FIA Motorsport Games drivers
Campos Racing drivers
TCR Europe Touring Car Series drivers